Megachile pallida is a species of bee in the family Megachilidae. It was described by Radoszkowski in 1881.

References

Pallida
Insects described in 1881